Clarence DeWitt Thorpe (December 14, 1887 – December 22, 1959) was an American football player and coach and a college faculty member. He served as the first head football coach at Northern Arizona Normal School—now known as Northern Arizona University—from 1915 to 1917, compiling a record of 9–5. During that time, Thorpe was also the head of the school's English department. Thorpe later served as a faculty member at the University of Arizona, the University of Oregon, and the University of Michigan.

Head coaching record

References

1887 births
1959 deaths
Arizona Wildcats football players
Ellsworth Community College alumni
Northern Arizona Lumberjacks football coaches
Northern Arizona University faculty
University of Arizona faculty
University of Michigan alumni
University of Michigan faculty
University of Oregon faculty
People from Franklin County, Iowa
Players of American football from Iowa